"No. No. No." was the response of British prime minister Margaret Thatcher to European Commission president Jacques Delors's proposals for European integration at the October 1990 European Council summit meeting in Rome. Her remarks led to the resignation of deputy prime minister Geoffrey Howe and the ensuing Conservative Party leadership election in which Thatcher was ousted.

Background

On 30 October 1990, a day after returning from the European Council summit meeting in Rome, Thatcher delivered a statement to the House of Commons on the summit. Both her foreign secretary Geoffrey Howe and chancellor Nigel Lawson had threatened resignation the previous year if Thatcher did not agree to let Britain join the European Exchange Rate Mechanism. Thatcher subsequently replaced Howe as foreign secretary, appointing him leader of the House and deputy prime minister. At the summit, Thatcher went against her cabinet's joint position by rejecting Britain's membership of any future arrangement for an economic and monetary union.

Thatcher was speaking in response to a question from the Leader of the Opposition, Neil Kinnock, when she said that:  Thatcher then continued by contending that "perhaps the Labour Party would give all those things up, easily. Perhaps they would agree to a single currency, to total abolition of the pound sterling. Perhaps, being totally incompetent with monetary matters, they'd be only too delighted to hand over the full responsibility, as they did to the IMF, to a central bank", the final part of her statement a reference to the 1976 sterling crisis under a Labour government.

Thatcher's "No. No. No." response was seen as undermining any progress that had been made at the summit in Rome. It was a spontaneous expression and had not been prepared. Biographer Charles Moore felt that she expressed her words "firmly" but "not vehemently", with each pronunciation of the negative exclamation "spoken quieter than the last" as she put her spectacles on, preparing to move on to her next point. Moore also felt that Thatcher's response was "endlessly and rightly quoted afterwards" as part of a "classic combative statement of her views" but was "almost always wrenched from its context"; she was not attacking the Community (EEC) or undermining her own government's policies, but was instead attacking the Commission for its ambition of further European integration (which her government and most Conservative MPs opposed), denouncing the idea that the EEC should acquire the attributes of a European government. Moore wrote that "for those long waiting to make their move  'No. No. No.' was not so much a shock as a cue".

Howe then resolved to resign from the government and join the back benches after Thatcher dismissed further EEC integration and the potentiality of a single currency, which had been espoused by the Delors Commission, with her "No. No. No."

Notes

References

Works cited

External links 
 HC Stmnt: [Rome European Council] ["No no no"] [film] at the Margaret Thatcher Foundation

1990 in British politics
1990 in the European Economic Community
Euroscepticism in the United Kingdom
Eurozone
Margaret Thatcher
Political quotes